Robert Colby (July 7, 1922 – March 10, 1987) was an American songwriter, music publisher and theatrical producer. Among his songs were "Jilted" and "Free Again".  He composed the music and lyrics for the 1962 Off-Broadway musical Half-past Wednesday, based on the fairy tale Rumpelstiltskin.

References

External links

1922 births
1987 deaths
American musical theatre composers
American musical theatre producers
American male songwriters
American music publishers (people)
20th-century American male musicians